The Musée Valentin Haüy is a private museum dedicated to tools and education of the blind, and located in the building of the Valentin Haüy Association, in the 7th arrondissement of Paris at 5, rue Duroc, Paris, France. It is open Tuesday and Wednesday afternoons without charge.

The museum was established in 1886 by Prof. Edgard Guilbeau of the Institut National des Jeunes Aveugles, and named in honor of Valentin Haüy (1745–1822), founder of the first school for the blind. It is now operated by the Association Valentin Haüy. The museum contains objects, equipment, and books from 1771 to the present day that document the history of tools and education for the visually impaired.

See also 
 List of museums in Paris

References 
 Musée Valentin Haüy
Valentin Haüy Association
 M. Dalphin and N. Dalphin, Le musée Valentin Haüy: guide du musée, Paris: Association Valentin Haüy, undated. 
 Catalogue du Musée Valentin-Haüy, 1891.
 Paris, Petit Futé, page 135. .
 Paris.org entry
 CityZeum entry

Museums established in 1886
Museums in Paris
Biographical museums in France
Medical museums in France
Education museums
Musee Valentin Hauy
Buildings and structures in the 7th arrondissement of Paris